Jadílson is a given name. It may refer to:

 Jadílson (footballer, born 1977), José Jadílson dos Santos Silva, Brazilian football left-back
 Jadílson (footballer, born 1980), Jadílson Carlos da Silva, Brazilian football striker